The 1973–74 Northern Premier League was the sixth season of the Northern Premier League, a regional football league in Northern England, the northern areas of the Midlands and North Wales. The season began on 11 August 1973 and concluded on 9 May 1974.

Overview

Team changes
The following club left the League at the end of the previous season:
Ellesmere Port Town resigned, demoted to Lancashire Combination

The following club joined the League at the start of the season:
Buxton promoted from Cheshire County League

League table

Results

Stadia and locations

Cup results

Challenge Cup

Northern Premier League Shield

Between Champions of NPL Premier Division and Winners of the NPL Cup.

FA Cup

Out of the twenty-four clubs from the Northern Premier League, only three teams reached for the second round:

Second Round

Third Round

FA Trophy

Out of the twenty-four clubs from the Northern Premier League, four teams reached for the fourth round:

Fourth Round

Semi-finals

Final

End of the season
At the end of the sixth season of the Northern Premier League none of the teams put forward for election received enough votes to be promoted to the Football League.  Bradford Park Avenue folded.

Football League elections 
Alongside the four Football League teams facing re-election, a total of seven non-League teams applied for election, one of which were from the Northern Premier League.  All four Football League teams were re-elected.

Promotion and relegation
The following club left the League at the end of the season:
Bradford Park Avenue  folded

The following club joined the League the following season:
Worksop Town promoted from Midland League (1889) (returning after a five year's absence)

References

External links
 Northern Premier League official website
 Northern Premier League tables at RSSSF
 Football Club History Database

Northern Premier League seasons
5